The Niakhar Power Station is a proposed  solar power plant in Senegal. The solar farm is under development by Energy Resources Senegal (ERS), a supplier of solar panels and Climate Fund Managers (CFM), an independent fund manager based in South Africa. The plan calls for an attached battery energy storage system rated at 15MW/45MWh. Th energy generated here will be sold to  Société nationale d'électricité du Sénégal (Senelec), for integration into the national grid.

Location
The power station would be located in  Niakhar, in the Fatick Department of the Fatick Region of Senegal.

Overview
In May 2022, Senegal's installed generation capacity was reported as 1,555 MW. At that time, the majority of electricity sources were from non-renewable fossil-fuel, with solar accounting for only 112 MW. This power station is part of the national plan to diversify the country's generation mix and reduce over-reliance of fossil-fuel sources.

The solar farm will have an attached battery energy storage system rated between 15MWh to 45MWh. The energy from this power station is enough to supply an estimated 150,000 Senegalese people.

Funding
The power station is reported to cost an estimated US$40 million to construct.

See also

 List of power stations in Senegal
 Diass Solar Power Station

References

External links
  Senegal: EPC tender for 30MW Niakhar solar As of 19 November 2020.

Solar power stations in Senegal
Fatick Region
Buildings and structures in Senegal
Proposed energy infrastructure